Smerinthulus quadripunctatus is a species of moth of the family Sphingidae first described by Huwe in 1895. It is known from Thailand and Sundaland.

The ground colour of the forewing is dull reddish yellow in the male, darker and more reddish in the female. There is a dark discal spot and a series of fine, irregular dark fasciae.

Subspecies
Smerinthulus quadripunctatus quadripunctatus (Sundaland)
Smerinthulus quadripunctatus cottoni Cadiou & Kitching, 1990 (Thailand)

References

Smerinthulus
Moths described in 1895